Stenochora is a genus of moths of the family Crambidae. It contains only one species, Stenochora lancinalis, the lanced pearl, which is found in southern and south-eastern Africa and the African islands of the Indian Ocean. The range includes Botswana, the Comoros (Mohéli, Grande Comore), the Democratic Republic of Congo, La Réunion, Madagascar, Mauritius, Mozambique, the Seychelles (Aldabra), South Africa, Tanzania, Zambia and Zimbabwe.

This species has a wingspan of about 25 mm-30mm and long and narrow forewings.

The larvae feed on Clerodendrum glabrum.

Subspecies
 Ischnurges lancinalis lancinalis (Mauritius, La Réunion)
 Ischnurges lancinalis paulianalis Marion, 1954 (Madagascar)
 Ischnurges lancinalis aldabrensis Viette, 1958 (Aldabra (Seychelles))
 Ischnurges lancinalis comorensis Viette, 1958 (Comoros)

References

Natural History Museum Lepidoptera genus database

Pyraustinae
Moths of Sub-Saharan Africa
Monotypic moth genera
Crambidae genera
Moths of the Comoros
Moths of Madagascar
Moths of Mauritius
Moths of Réunion
Moths of Seychelles
Taxa named by William Warren (entomologist)